3 Backyards is a film written and directed by Eric Mendelsohn and starring Embeth Davidtz. It premiered at the 2010 Sundance Film Festival, where it won the Directing Prize, as did Mendelsohn's first feature, Judy Berlin; Mendelsohn is the only director to have won the prize twice.

The independent film was released theatrically by Screen Media Films in March 2011.

Plot 
The story of three people from the same suburban town during the course of one curious autumn day.

Cast
 Embeth Davidtz as The Actress
 Edie Falco as Peggy
 Elias Koteas as John
 Rachel Resheff as Christina
 Kathryn Erbe as John's Wife

See also
 List of Sundance Film Festival award winners

References

External links
 

2010s English-language films
2010 drama films
American drama films
Films directed by Eric Mendelsohn
American independent films
2010 films
2010 independent films
2010s American films